The Ladies' Golf Union (LGU) was the governing body for women's and girls' amateur golf in Great Britain and Ireland. It was founded in 1893 and was based in St Andrews, Fife, Scotland until merging with The R&A  at the start of 2017.

Issette Pearson was a founding member and the first Secretary of the LGU.

The LGU was governed by an elected council with equal representation from England, Ireland, Scotland and Wales. It was funded by a levy on women golfers' club membership fees, and indirectly represented over 200,000 golfers. It dealt with major policy issues, all-Britain and Ireland tournaments, and international competitions. It had affiliates in England, Ireland, Scotland and Wales which organise local tournaments, ran the handicapping system, liaised with clubs, and promoted the sport at a local level.

The LGU administered the Women's British Open, one of the major championships in global women's golf, which is open to professionals and nowadays dominated by them. It also ran several of Britain and Ireland championships: Amateur, Mid Amateur, Girls', Stroke Play, and Seniors. Additionally there are several competitions for club golfers.

The LGU ran three sets of international matches between teams from England, Ireland, Scotland and Wales: the Home International Matches (mainstream adult competition); the Girls International Matches; and the Senior International Matches. The LGU was also involved in running several competitions involving teams from beyond its home territory: Curtis Cup; Vagliano Trophy; Espirito Santo Trophy; and Commonwealth competitions.

See also
English Ladies' Golf Union - there are similar bodies for Scotland, Wales and Ireland
Ladies European Tour - a professional tour
The R&A - the governing body of golf in the UK & Ireland (and most of the rest of the world).
English Golf Union - governing body of men's amateur golf in England.
Women's World Golf Rankings
Golf in Ireland

References

Golf associations
Golf in Scotland
Golf in the United Kingdom
Women's sports governing bodies in Scotland
Women's sports governing bodies in the United Kingdom
Organisations based in Fife
St Andrews
1893 establishments in the United Kingdom
Women's golf in the United Kingdom
Women's golf in Ireland
2016 disestablishments in the United Kingdom
Sports organizations disestablished in 2016
Sports organizations established in 1893